This page provides the summary of Red Bull BC One World Finals Italy 2015

The 12th edition of Red Bull BC One was held on November 14 in Rome's Palazzo dei Congressi. Over 70 Cyphers took place and 6 Regional Finals took place around the world. The six regional Finals were located in Georgia, USA, Peru, South Korea, Spain and Egypt. The winners of these finals will go on to battle in Rome alongside ten Wild Card entries, chosen by an international team of B-Boy experts.

Regional Finals

RBBC1 North American 2015 results 

Location: Orlando, United States

RBBC1 Middle East Africa 2015 results

Location: Cairo, Egypt

RBBC1 Western European 2015 results

Location: Madrid, Spain

RBBC1 Eastern European 2015 results

Location: Tbilisi, Georgia

Judges:

 Pelezinho (Tsunami All Stars, Brazil)
 Lilou (Pockemon, France/Algeria)
 Mounir (Vagabonds, France)

Individuals in bold won their respective battles.

RBBC1 Latin American 2015 results 

Location: Lima, Peru

RBBC1 Asia Pacific 2015 results 
Location: Seoul, South Korea

World Finals

Judges: 
 Cico ( / Spinkingz, Red Bull BC One All Stars)
 Focus ( / Flow Mo Crew)
 Wing ( / Jinjo Crew, 7 Commandoz, Red Bull BC One All Stars)
 Lamine ( / Vagabonds)
 Poe One ( / Style Elements)

MC: MC Supernatural

DJ: DJ Marrrtin

2015 Main Event Competitor List

Prior to the 2015 Red Bull BC One World Finals, Menno, from the Netherlands, held the best record against other competitors.

 Menno (9-1)
Won vs Bruce Almighty at Unbreakable 2013 (finals)
Won vs. Sunni at UKBboy 2013 (quarters)
Won vs. Issei at BOTY 2013 (semis)
Won vs Kareem at Chelles 2014 (finals)
Lost vs. Victor at Silverback 2014 (round of 32) 
Won vs. Nino at Undisputed 2014 (group stage)
Won vs. Alkolil at Undisputed 2014 (semis)
Won vs Alkolil at RBBC1 2014 (semis)
Won vs. Sunni at BOTY 2015 (semis)
Won vs. Alkolil at BOTY 2015 (finals)

 Victor (7-4)
Won vs. Kareem at RBBC1 USA 2011 (semis)
Won vs. El Niño at RBBC1 USA 2011 (finals)
Won vs Issei at RBBC1 2012 (round of 16)
Lost vs. Bruce Almighty at Unbreakable 2014 (round of 16)
Won vs. Menno at Silverback 2014 (round of 32)
Lost vs. Alkilol at RBBC1 2014 (quarters)
Won vs. Issei at CultureShock 2015 (semis)
Lost vs. Issei at R16 2015 (quarters)
Lost vs. Alkolil at BOTY 2015 (quarters)
Won vs. Issei at Silverback 2015 (finals)
Won vs. El Niño at FSS 2015 (quarters)

 Sunni (6-5)
Lost vs. Kareem at UKBboy 2012 (quarters)
Lost vs. Menno at UKBboy 2013 (quarters)
Lost vs. Kareem at UKBboy 2014 (quarters)
Won vs. Ratin at IBE 2015 (round of 16)
Won vs. Issei at IBE 2015 (semis)
Won vs. Kareem at IBE 2015 (finals)
Won vs. El Nino at BOTY 2015 (quarters)
Lost vs. Menno at BOTY 2015 (semis)
Won vs. Killa Kolya at Silverback 2015 (round of 32)
Won vs. Thomaz at Silverback 2015 (round of 16)
Lost vs. Issei at Silverback 2015 (semis)

 Issei (5-7)
Lost vs. Victor at RBBC1 2012 (round of 16)
Won vs Pocket at BOTY 2013 (quarters)
Lost vs Menno at BOTY 2013 (semis)
Won vs. Lil Zoo at R16 2014 (finals)
Lost vs. Alkolil at Undisputed 2014 (group stage)
Lost vs. Victor at CultureShock 2015 (semis)
Won vs. Victor at R16 2015 (quarters) 
Lost vs. Sunni at IBE 2015 (semis)
Lost vs. Leon at RBBC1 Asia 2015 (finals)
Won vs Kareem at Silverback 2015 (quarters)
Won vs Sunni at Silverback 2015 (semis)
Lost vs. Victor at Silverback 2015 (finals)

 Alkolil (4-4)
Won vs. Kazuki Rock at BOTY 2014 (semis)
Won vs Victor at RBBC1 2014 (quarters)
Lost vs. Menno at RBBC1 2014 (semis)
Won vs. Issei at Undisputed 2014 (group stage)
Lost vs. Menno at Undisputed 2014 (semis)
Won vs. Victor at BOTY 2015 (quarters)
Lost vs. Menno at BOTY 2015 (finals)
Lost vs. Thomaz at Silverback 2015 (round of 32)

 Kareem (3-4)
Lost vs. Victor at RBBC1 USA 2011 (semis)
Won vs. Sunni at UKBboy 2012 (quarters)
Lost vs. Menno at Chelles 2014 (finals)
Won vs. Sunni at UKBboy 2014 (quarters)
Won vs. Kazuki Rock at HipOpsession 2015 (quarters)
Lost vs. Sunni at IBE 2015 (finals)
Lost vs. Issei at Silverback 2015 (quarters)

 Bruce Almighty (2-1)
Lost vs. Menno at Unbreakable 2013 (finals)
Won vs. Victor at Unbreakable 2014 (round of 16)
Won vs. Nasso at RBBC1 W.Europe 2015 (finals)

 Thomaz (2-1)
Won vs. El Niño at Warsaw 2015 (semis)
Won vs. Alkolil at Silverback 2015 (round of 32)
Lost vs. Sunni at Silverback 2015 (round of 16)

 El Nino (1-5)
Lost vs. Victor at RBBC1 USA 2011 (finals)
Won vs. Kazuki Rock at Hustle&Freeze 2013 (quarters)
Lost vs. Menno at Undisputed 2014 (group stage)
Lost vs. Thomaz at Warsaw 2015 (semis)
Lost vs. Sunni at BOTY 2015 (quarters)
Lost vs. Victor at FSS 2015 (quarters)

 Lil Zoo (1-1)
Won vs Pocket at HipHipTours 2013 (final) 
Lost vs. Issei at R16 2014 (finals)

 Leon (1-0)
Won vs. Issei at RBBC1 Asia 2015 (finals)

 Kazuki Roc (0-3)
Lost vs. El Nino at Hustle&Freeze 2013 (quarters)
Lost vs. Alkolil at BOTY 2014 (semis)
Lost vs. Kareem at HipOpsession 2015 (quarters)

 Pocket (0-2)
Lost vs Lil Zoo at HipHipTours 2013 (final) 
Lost vs. Issei at BOTY 2013 (quarters)

 Killa Kolya (0-1)
Lost vs. Sunni at Silverback 2015 (round of 32)

 Ratin (0-1)
Lost vs Sunni at IBE 2015 (semis)

 Nasso (0-1)
Lost vs. Bruce Almighty at RBBC1 W.Europe 2015 (finals)

Red Bull BC One 2015 Bracket

References

External links
 Red Bull BC One World Finals 2015

Red Bull BC One